Banwalipur  is a village in Kapurthala district of Punjab State, India. The village is administrated by a Sarpanch who is an elected representative.

Demography 
According to the 2011 Census of India, Banwalipur had a total number of 158 houses and a population of 713, of which 362 were males and 351 females. The literacy rate was 77.37%, higher than state average of 75.84%.  The population of children under the age of 6 years was 59, which represented 8.27% of the total population. The child sex ratio was approximately 1107, higher than the state average of 846.

Population data

References

External links 
  Villages in Kapurthala
 Kapurthala Villages List

Villages in Kapurthala district